Vazhamuttom is a village township near to Pathanamthitta Town in Pathanamthitta District, Kerala, India. River Achankovil split Vazhamuttom in to two parts West Vazhamuttom and East Vazhamuttom. Thazhur Kadavu palam (bridge) connect both place together near Thazhoor Temple.

Thazhoor Temple

Vazhamuttom is famous for the ancient Thazhoor Bhagavathy Kshetram(temple).
"Padayani" performances are held at the temple annually. Padayani songs are very ancient folklore of Kerala.

Churches
Three Christian churches are located in Vazhamuttom Mar Bahanan Orthodox Valyapally St. Bahanan Orthodox Malankara Catholic Church and St. Mary Jacobite church are famous for Perunal. This Perunal is celebrated in every year December by Bahanan churches and January by St. Mary Jacobite church.  Oldest among this church is Mar Bahanan Orthodox Valyapally foundation stone laid by Parumala Thirumany.

Government UP School 
This school is oldest school in Vazhamuttom. Old generations were studied in this school and it was fully malayalam medium school. When assembly and parliament election held in Kerala this school was only school where voters come and cast their votes in peace and brotherhood. Excellent Students of this school spread not only their identity in other districts, but also in America Germany and other part of the world. Doctors, Engineers, Teachers, Nurses, Army Navy Air force officers and soldiers spread across the world are result of this school's teachers higher devotion to the education in this village.

Folk dances
The padayani folk-dances are traditionally preserved in this part of Kerala.
The word padayani literally means military formations or rows of army, but in this folk art we have mainly a series of divine and semi-divine impersonations wearing huge masks or kolams of different shapes, colours and designs painted on the stalks of arecanut fronds.
The Padayani is dedicated to the Goddess Bhadrakaali.  The Padayani is a marvellous combination of music, dance, painting and satire.  The Padayani is conducted during the Malayalam Calendar months of Kumbham, Meenam and Medam (The English months of February, March and April).
The temple is located on the banks of River Achankovil, with doors opening to the river.

Access
The district capital, Pathanamthitta which is 4 km away is well connected to all major towns and cities of India. Vazhamuttom is connected to Pathanamthitta, Konni, Adoor & Pandalam by large number of privately operated public buses. Buses from Pathanamthitta Town to Vallicode Kottayam (V-Kottayam) ply through Vazhamuttom on a regular interval of 30 minutes. One can reach there by buses operating in Konni - Pandalam and Konni - Adoor route, too.

Other attractions
Mahavishnu temple  is believed to be built by the King of Pandalam. Apart from this there are  five Christian churches in Vazhamuttom. Two of the  churches are located at the  area on the east bank of Achankovil river and two on the west. Mar Bahanam Valiyapally is the oldest church in Vazhamuttom which was established in the year 1893. Church foundation stone laid by Parumala Thirumeny. Another important holy place named Kanjirappara (Lord Shiva) situated 1.5 km away from Mahavishnu temple.

Geography
Vazhamuttom is located on the banks of River Achankovil. Vazhamuttom is the meeting point of Chandanapally-Konni Road, Pathanamthitta-Thazhoorkadavu Road and Omallur-Thazhoorkadavu Road.
Pathanamthitta-Thazhoorkadavu Road serves as a parallel road to Kaipattoor - Pathanamthitta Road. We can reach Kaipattoor via Mayalil. It helps to avoid the busiest Kaipattoor - Pathanamthitta Road and one can reach Kaipattoor Kadav Junction and can turn left to reach Adoor via Thatta and Anandapally and reaching MC road to continue to the State Capital Thiruvananthapuram.

See also
 Kaipattoor
 Padayani
 Temples of Kerala
 River Achankovil
 Vallicode
 Pathanamthitta
 Omallur
 Kadammanitta

References

Villages in Pathanamthitta district

Vazhamuttom Government UP school
edited by Jacob Sam Ernakulam